A Timely Interception is a 1913 American short drama film directed by  D. W. Griffith.

Cast
 W. Chrystie Miller as The Farmer
 Lillian Gish as The Farmer's Daughter
 Robert Harron as The Farmer's Adopted Son
 Lionel Barrymore as The Farmer's Brother
 Joseph McDermott as The Oil Syndicate
 William J. Butler as The Oil Syndicate
 Alfred Paget as The Oil Syndicate
 Frank Evans as First Foreman
 Frank Opperman as Second Foreman
 Adolph Lestina as The Farmer's Brother's Friend
 Charles Gorman as The Policeman
 Christy Cabanne
 Mae Marsh

See also
 D. W. Griffith filmography
 Lillian Gish filmography
 Lionel Barrymore filmography

References

External links

1913 films
Films directed by D. W. Griffith
American silent short films
1913 drama films
1913 short films
American black-and-white films
Silent American drama films
1910s American films
1910s English-language films
American drama short films